Sick child or Sick Child may refer to:
 Sick child scam, confidence trick
 The Sick Child (Metsu), c.1660 oil painting by Gabriël Metsu
 The Sick Child (Munch), several works between 1885 and 1926 by Edvard Munch